William Orton Williams, (July 7, 1839 – June 9, 1863) called Orton Williams until he changed his name to Lawrence Williams Orton, was a Confederate officer during the American Civil War who, after being caught behind Union lines in a U.S. Army uniform, was executed as a spy.

Early life
Orton Williams was the son of Captain William G. Williams, an officer in the Corps of Topographical Engineers, and America Pinckney Peters Williams. Captain Williams died of wounds sustained in the Battle of Monterey in 1846 and, as his wife had predeceased him, young Orton was raised by his sister Martha Custis Williams. A cousin of Mary Lee, the wife of Confederate General Robert E. Lee, Orton spent many days of his youth at Arlington House, playing as a child and waiting upon Eleanor Agnes Lee, Robert E. Lee's third daughter, as a young man.

U.S. Army
In 1859, Williams served as a civilian employee of the Corps of Engineers, for the survey of Minnesota. He was later appointed aid in the United States Coast Survey.  In 1861 Williams was, on Robert E. Lee's recommendation, commissioned second lieutenant in Second United States Cavalry, Lee's regiment, direct from civil life. Promoted to first lieutenant the same year, Lieutenant Williams served as aide-de-camp to General Winfield Scott in Washington. After the outbreak of the Civil War he tendered his resignation from the U.S. Army; Scott offered him an instructorship at West Point that would have let him remain in the army, but not having to fight his family and friends. When Williams insisted on leaving the army, he was arrested on suspicion of having passed classified information to the Confederates, but was released after a few weeks. His brother Lawrence, who was a captain in the Tenth U.S. Infantry, remained in the U.S. Army.

Confederate Army
After joining the Confederate army, Williams was transferred to the West and served as an aide to General Leonidas Polk, fighting at the Battle of Shiloh. William's popularity declined when he killed an insubordinate private soldier and he was transferred to the artillery under the command of Braxton Bragg. There he changed his name to Lawrence Williams Orton, as he said because his brother remained in the Union army, but perhaps to wipe out the stains of the ugly killing. On leave in Virginia, at Christmas 1862, Williams proposed to Eleanor Agnes Lee, but was rejected. Shortly thereafter he married another woman, possibly a Mrs. Lamb, who according to rumors already was married.

Death

On June 8, 1863 Colonel Orton and his cousin, Lieutenant Walter G. Peters were arrested by the US Army.  They were behind Union lines in Franklin, Tennessee, and were dressed as officers in the Union Army, traveled under false names, and carried falsified papers claiming that they were inspectors of the U.S. Army. Under questioning, the two gave their real names to the federal commandant, Colonel John P. Baird, of the 85th Indiana Volunteer Infantry. Baird was instructed by General William Rosecrans to have them immediately tried by court-martial. A court was convened at short notice, sat during the night, and at three o'clock in the morning of June 9, found the accused guilty of being spies. Rosecrans rejected pleads of clemency and ordered their immediate execution, which was carried out by hanging about six hours after the verdict. The nature of Orton's mission is unclear. Orton claimed that both officers were under their way to Canada and Europe, purportedly in some secret mission for the Confederacy. The execution of Orton dismayed Robert E. Lee; although he conceded that the officers were technically in violation of the laws of war, he believed that clemency should have been shown. Agnes Lee was deeply taken by the death of Orton; it was a trauma from which she never recovered, and it came only year after the death of her beloved sister Annie.

Williams was interred at Oak Hill Cemetery in Washington, D.C.

References

Notes

Sources
 
 
 
 
 
 
 
 
 
 Report of the Superintendent of the Coast Survey for the year 1860. Washington, DC: Government Printing Office, 1861. [Cited as Report of the Coast Survey 1860.]
 

1839 births
1863 deaths
Military personnel from Buffalo, New York
American Civil War spies
Executed people from New York (state)
Confederate States of America military personnel killed in the American Civil War
People executed by the United States military by hanging
19th-century executions by the United States
Executed military personnel
United States Army officers
Confederate States Army officers
Executed spies
United States Army civilians
Burials at Oak Hill Cemetery (Washington, D.C.)